The neo-Ricardian school is an economic school of thought 
that derives from the close reading and interpretation of David Ricardo by Piero Sraffa, and from Sraffa's critique of neoclassical economics as presented in his The Production of Commodities by Means of Commodities, and further developed by the neo-Ricardians in the course of the Cambridge capital controversy.  It particularly disputes neoclassical theory of income distribution. 

Prominent neo-Ricardians are usually held to include Pierangelo Garegnani, Krishna Bharadwaj, Luigi Pasinetti, Joan Robinson, John Eatwell, Fernando Vianello, Murray Milgate, Ian Steedman, Heinz D. Kurz, Neri Salvadori, Bertram Schefold, Fabio Petri, Massimo Pivetti, Franklin Serrano, Fabio Ravagnani, Roberto Ciccone, Sergio Parrinello, Alessandro Roncaglia, Maurice Dobb, Gilbert Abraham-Frois, Theodore Mariolis and Giorgio Gilibert.

The school partially overlaps with post-Keynesian and neo-Marxian economics.

See also
Cambridge capital controversy
Okishio's theorem
Ricardian economics
Capital accumulation

External links
 The Neo-Ricardians(archive), History of Economic Thought website, New School University

Schools of economic thought
Classical economics
Political ideologies
Eponymous economic ideologies
Eponymous political ideologies